The Myeongnyang Strait (also known as Uldolmok Strait; meaning Screaming Strait), just off the southwest corner of South Korea, separates Jindo Island from the mainland. It also separates the administrative district of Haenam County (on the mainland) from Jindo County. The strait experiences tidal water speeds that exceed .

History and description
The strait has proved important at several points in Korean history. The seclusion it provided allowed the Sambyeolcho Rebellion to take refuge here in 1271. In 1597, during the Imjin War, the Korean admiral, Yi Sun-sin, achieved a decisive victory in the Battle of Myeongnyang although he was massively outnumbered by the Japanese fleet. Tidal forces mean that the currents of the Myeongnyang Strait reverse direction roughly every three hours.

Today, the strait is spanned by the Jindo (island) bridge, South Korea's longest cable-stayed bridge. There is also a memorial to Yi Sun-sin on the coast.

The Myeongnyang Strait, during the lifetime of Yi Sun-Shin, was also known as 'Uldolmok,' or 'the Roaring Channel,' most likely because of the powerful tides of the channel, which are especially loud during springtime.

See also 
 Geography of South Korea
 History of Korea
 Uldolmok Tidal Power Station

References

Landforms of South Jeolla Province
Straits of South Korea